Far Rockaway is a neighborhood on the eastern part of the Rockaway peninsula in the New York City borough of Queens. It is the easternmost section of the Rockaways. The neighborhood extends from Beach 32nd Street east to the Nassau  County line. Its southern boundary is the Atlantic Ocean; it is one of the neighborhoods along Rockaway Beach.

Far Rockaway is located in Queens Community District 14 and its ZIP Code is 11691. It is patrolled by the New York City Police Department's 101st Precinct.

History

The indigenous inhabitants of the Rockaways were the Canarsie Indians, a band of Mohegan, whose name was associated with the geography. By 1639, the Mohegan tribe sold most of the Rockaways to the Dutch West India Company. In 1664, the English defeated the Dutch colony and took over their lands in present-day New York. In 1685, the band chief, Tackapoucha, and the English governor of the province agreed to sell the Rockaways to a Captain Palmer for 31 pounds sterling.

The Rockaway Peninsula was originally designated as part of the Town of Hempstead, then a part of Queens County. Palmer and the Town of Hempstead disputed over who owned Rockaway, so in 1687 he sold the land to Richard Cornell, an iron master from Flushing. Cornell and his family lived on a homestead on what is now Central Avenue, near the shore of the Atlantic Ocean. At his death, Cornell was buried in a small family cemetery, Cornell Cemetery.

In the late 19th century, the Rockaway Association wanted to build a hotel on the Rockaway Peninsula, as it was increasingly popular as a summer destination. The association, consisting of many wealthy members who had homes in the area, bought most of Cornell's old homestead property. They developed the Marine Pavilion on that site, which attracted such guests as Henry Wadsworth Longfellow, Washington Irving, and the Vanderbilt family. The Rockaway Association also built the Rockaway Turnpike. The Marine Hotel burned to the ground in 1864, but more hotels and private residences were built in the area.

In the 19th century, people traveled to the Rockaways by horse-drawn carriages or on horseback. A ferry powered by steam sailed from Lower Manhattan to Brooklyn. By the 1880s, the Long Island Rail Road's Rockaway Beach Branch was built to serve Far Rockaway station. The steam railroad went to Long Island City and Flatbush Terminal (now Atlantic Terminal). When it opened in the 1880s, this connection stimulated population growth on the Rockaway Peninsula. Benjamin Mott gave the LIRR  of land for a railroad depot. Land values increased and businesses in the area grew, and by 1888, Far Rockaway was a relatively large village.  It incorporated as a village on September 19 of that year.

By 1898, the area was incorporated into the Greater City of New York, which included Queens. Far Rockaway, Hammels, and Arverne, all of Queens, tried to secede from the city several times. In 1915 and 1917, a bill approving the secession passed in the legislature but was vetoed by the New York City mayor John Purroy Mitchel.

Demographics

Based on data from the 2010 United States Census, the population of Far Rockaway was 50,058, a change of 1,714 (3.4%) from the 48,344 counted in 2000.

The racial makeup of the neighborhood was 25.5% (12,778) White, 44.7% (22,400) African American, 0.3% (175) Native American, 1.9% (931) Asian, 0.1% (44) Pacific Islander, 1% (504) from other races, and 1.7% (860) from two or more races. Hispanic or Latino of any race were 24.7% (12,366) of the population.

Far Rockaway is a diverse neighborhood with many immigrants from Jamaica, Guyana, and Guatemala, as well as Russia and Ukraine. It also is home to a significant number of Orthodox Jews.

Points of interest

Bungalows

The Far Rockaway Beach Bungalow Historic District recognizes an area with a distinct character. This and individual properties, such as the Russell Sage Memorial Church, Trinity Chapel, and United States Post Office are listed on the National Register of Historic Places.

With its nearby beach, Far Rockaway attracted tourists and vacationers from the other boroughs. Bungalows were the homes of choice for many residents who lived in Far Rockaway.  The railroad abandoned the Rockaway Beach Branch in 1950 because of the shift of many people to driving private cars.  In addition, this destination had to compete with the many others that people were visiting by car and air travel, which created access to even more distant destinations and heightened competition for travel dollars.

As the neighborhood's heyday as a resort community declined in the 1950s, the city built substantial numbers of public housing developments to try to replace substandard housing after World War II. Bungalows and other residential housing were converted to year-round use for low-income residents. Some bungalows were used as public housing. The 1970s New York City budget crisis had a negative effect on the provision of social services, and problems of poverty, unemployment and drug use increased in this area.

In September 1984, residents founded the Beachside Bungalow Preservation Association to "improve the quality of the Far Rockaway community through preservation, education, and cultural programs". The organization donated a collection of materials highlighting its history, correspondence, and activities to the Queens Library Archives in 2008.

Parks
 O'Donohue Park
 Bayswater Point State Park

Police and crime
Far Rockaway is patrolled by the NYPD's 101st Precinct, located at 16-12 Mott Avenue. The 101st Precinct and the adjoining 100th Precinct, which serves the rest of the Rockaways, collectively ranked 10th safest out of 69 patrol areas for per-capita crime in 2010. However, the low-income and densely populated 101st Precinct has significantly more crime than the 100th Precinct, which is high-income and more insular.

The 101st Precinct has a lower crime rate than in the 1990s, with crimes across all categories having decreased by 74.6% between 1990 and 2018. The precinct reported 6 murders, 26 rapes, 151 robberies, 301 felony assaults, 98 burglaries, 250 grand larcenies, and 31 grand larcenies auto in 2018.

Fire safety 
Far Rockaway is served by the New York City Fire Department (FDNY)'s Engine Cos. 264 and 328/Ladder Co. 134, located at 16-15 Central Avenue.

Post office and ZIP Code 
Far Rockaway is covered by ZIP Code 11691. The United States Post Office operates the Far Rockaway Station at 18-36 Mott Avenue.

Education

Schools

Public schools
The neighborhood, like all of New York City, is served by the New York City Department of Education. Far Rockaway residents are zoned to several different elementary schools:
 P.S. 43
 P.S. 104 (The Bayswater School) (Kindergarten–6th grade)
 P.S. 105 (The Bay School)
 P.S. 106
 P.S. 197 (The Ocean School)
 P.S. 215 (W.A.V.E Prep)
 P.S. 253

Far Rockaway residents are zoned to M.S. 53 Brian Piccolo.

All New York City residents who wish to attend a public high school must apply to high schools. Far Rockaway High School was located in Far Rockaway, but was shut down in 2011 as a stand-alone institution.  During the administration of Mayor Michael Bloomberg in 2011, many large, underperforming, older traditional high schools were closed in the city. The 1929 building was renovated to operate as the Far Rockaway Educational Campus, home to a number of smaller, specialized academies that share the building. They can provide more individualized attention to their students. The former Beach Channel High School was similarly closed in 2014 and repurposed to house several smaller, specialized academies; it is in Rockaway Park, near Far Rockaway, and draws some of its students from Far Rockaway.

Library
Queens Public Library operates the Far Rockaway branch at a temporary location at 1003 Beach 20th Street. The library was formerly located at Central Avenue. In 2013, New York magazine reported that the city planned to construct a public library in the neighborhood, to be designed by the internationally known architectural firm Snøhetta. Construction started in November 2018.

Jewish institutions
During the early and mid-20th century, many Jewish immigrants and their working-class descendants settled in Far Rockaway, sometimes first as summer visitors. They founded numerous synagogues and private schools, including those devoted to all-boys or all-girls institutions for educating Orthodox children. Following World War II, as residential housing was developed in Nassau and later Suffolk counties, many Jewish families left the Rockaways for newer housing. According to The New York Times, Far Rockaway had "flourished in the 1940s but withered...1960s" until "a few Jewish families...started the Hebrew Free Loan Society for new home buyers."

Synagogues include Congregation Kneseth Israel in Far Rockaway (The White Shul), which was founded in 1922. Schools include Sh'or Yoshuv Institute of Jewish Studies/Sh'or Yoshuv Yeshiva, Yeshiva Darchei Torah and the Yeshiva of Far Rockaway.

Other synagogues (past and present):

Other schools (past and present):

Transportation

Far Rockaway is served by the following transportation services:
 The New York City Subway's IND Rockaway Line, which has a terminal at Mott Avenue.
 The Far Rockaway terminal station for the Long Island Rail Road's Far Rockaway Branch. The branch had been part of a loop with service along the existing route, continuing through the Rockaway Peninsula and crossing on a trestle across Jamaica Bay through Queens, where it reconnected with other branches. Frequent fires and maintenance problems led the LIRR to abandon the Queens portion of the route. The city acquired this to develop the IND Rockaway Line.
 MTA Regional Bus Operations: 
 Nassau Inter-County Express: . Unlike other NICE routes in Queens, these buses operate open-door in Far Rockaway, meaning customers can ride these buses wholly within the neighborhood without going to Nassau County.

Notable people

 Richard Bey (born 1951), talk show host; went to Far Rockaway High School.
 Baruch Samuel Blumberg (1925–2011), winner of 1976 Nobel Prize in Medicine; graduated from Far Rockaway High School in 1942.
 Steven Brill (born 1950), journalist and founder of Court TV.
 Joyce Brothers (1927–2013), family psychologist and advice columnist; grew up in Far Rockaway.
 Chinx (1983–2015), rapper, grew up in both the Redfern Houses and Edgemere Houses (the latter are now known as Ocean Bay Apartments).
 Cormega (born Cory McKay, 1970), rapper, lived in Far Rockaway as a youth.
 Mac DeMarco (born 1990), Canadian songwriter and musician; has a house in Far Rockaway, where he recorded his album Another One.
 Father MC (born 1967), recording artist with Uptown Records
 Folorunso Fatukasi (born 1995), defensive end for the New York Jets.
Olakunle Fatukasi (born 1999), linebacker for Rutgers
 Joan Feynman (1927–2020), astrophysicist and NASA Exceptional Achievement Medal recipient.
 Richard Feynman (1918–1988), physicist and Nobel Prize winner; grew up in Far Rockaway and graduated from Far Rockaway High School.
 Marcus Gaither (1961–2020), professional basketball player in France and Israel, who played the guard position and led the Israel Basketball Premier League in scoring in 1989–90.
 Mary Gordon (born 1949), writer of novels, memoirs, and literary criticism, and professor at Barnard College; born in Far Rockaway and lived there for several years
 Carl Icahn (born 1936), businessman and philanthropist; grew up in Far Rockaway and went to Far Rockaway High School.
 Al Jaffee (born 1921), cartoonist best known for his work in the satirical magazine Mad, including his trademark feature, the Mad Fold-in.
 Nancy Lieberman (born 1958), women's basketball pioneer; grew up in Far Rockaway
 Deborah Lipstadt (born 1947), historian.
 Bernard Madoff (1938-2021), former American stockbroker, investment advisor, and financier who was convicted of fraud; went to Far Rockaway High School, where he met his wife, Ruth Alpern.
 Steve Madden (born 1958), shoe designer and former CEO of Steve Madden Ltd; born in Far Rockaway.
 Cliff Mass (born 1952/53), atmospheric sciences professor and weather and climate blogger; born in Far Rockaway.
 Alice Nielsen (1872–1943), Broadway performer and operatic soprano; owned a house in Far Rockaway in the 1920s.
 Barbara Novak (born 1929), art historian, novelist, National Book Award for Nonfiction finalist.
 Phil Ochs (1940–1976), folk-protest singer; resided here for a period during childhood and died at his sister's home here.
 Ryan Pearson (born 1990), professional basketball player

 Kelly Price (born 1973), nine-time Grammy nominated R&B and gospel singer and songwriter grew up in the Edgemere Projects.
 Rammellzee (1960–2010), rap pioneer; born and died in Far Rockaway.
 Kenneth Alan Ribet (born 1948), mathematician.
 Burton Richter (1931–2018), winner of 1976 Nobel Prize in Physics; graduated from Far Rockaway High School in 1948.
 Gary Schwartz (born 1940), art historian.
 MC Serch (born 1967 as Michael Berrin), former member of the hip hop group 3rd Bass.
 Raymond Smullyan (1919-2017), mathematician; grew up in Far Rockaway.
 Herbert Sturhahn (1902–1979), football player elected to the College Football Hall of Fame; born in Far Rockaway.

Notes

References

External links

 Old Rockaway, New York, in Early Photographs by Vincent Seyfried, William Asadorian
 Far Rockaway: Abandoned Bungalows a 2009 photo essay by Nathan Kensinger

Former villages in New York City
Neighborhoods in Queens, New York
Neighborhoods in Rockaway, Queens
Populated coastal places in New York (state)
Orthodox Judaism in New York City